Ernest Lenell "J. R." Bremer (born September 19, 1980) is a retired American-Bosnian former professional basketball player who last played for Limoges CSP of the LNB Pro A. Bremer has also played in the NBA and was an NBA All-Rookie second team member. He also represented the senior men's Bosnia and Herzegovina national basketball team and was one of the highest-paid point guards in Europe in 2008. He is the grandson of former Negro Leagues pitcher Eugene Bremer.

College career
Bremer played college basketball at St. Bonaventure University, with the St. Bonaventure Bonnies men's basketball team.

Professional career
In 2002, Bremer attended the NBA Chicago pre-draft camp and tested as the number one tested athlete. Although Bremer went undrafted, he signed as an undrafted free agent with the NBA's Boston Celtics in 2002, and in that season he was named to the NBA All-Rookie Second Team.  He spent two seasons in the NBA, with the Celtics (2002–03), the Cleveland Cavaliers (2003–04), and the Golden State Warriors (2003–04), averaging 6.5 points and 2.2 assists per game. He became known as a 3-point specialist. The Charlotte Bobcats selected him from the Warriors in the NBA expansion draft, and then waived him shortly thereafter, before he played any games with the club.

Since 2004, he has played in Europe, competing for the following clubs: Málaga of the Spanish League where he won the Spanish King's Cup. He played for Biella and Olimpia Milano of the Italian League, PAOK of the Greek League, Bosna of the Bosnia and Herzegovina League, Spartak Primorje of the Russian Super League, Triumph Lyubertsy, Krasnye Krylya Samara and Nizhny Novgorod of the Russian Pro League, and Fenerbahçe Ülker of the Turkish League.

In 2009, he signed a contract with Krasnye Krylya Samara of the Russian Super League. In July 2011, he signed a contract with BC Nizhny Novgorod. In January 2012, Bremer moved to the Italian Serie A team Olimpia Milano. Later that year, he signed a contract with Fenerbahçe Ülker. In December 2012, Bremer left Fenerbahçe Ülker and returned to his former club Emporio Armani Milano. For the 2013–14 season he signed with Royal Halı Gaziantep.

On December 5, 2014, Bremer signed with his former team PAOK Thessaloniki. In January 2015, he left PAOK and returned to Turkey where he signed with Torku Konyaspor. In May 2015, after the end of the 2014–15 Turkish League season, he returned to PAOK for the Greek playoffs. On July 30, 2015, he returned to Torku Konyaspor. On April 19, 2016, he parted ways with Konyaspor.

On December 28, 2016, Bremer signed with Limoges CSP.

Coaching career

Bremer took the head coaching position at his high school alma mater, Cleveland Heights High School, on May 22, 2019. Bremer's No. 22 jersey has previously been retired by the school.

NBA career statistics

Regular season 

|-
| style="text-align:left;"| 
| style="text-align:left;"|Boston
| 64 || 41 || 23.5 || .369 || .353 || .766 || 2.3 || 2.6 || 0.6 || 0.0 || 8.3
|-
| style="text-align:left;"| 
| style="text-align:left;"|Cleveland
| 31 || 2 || 13.0 || .285 || .288 || .650 || 1.1 || 1.3 || 0.6 || 0.1 || 3.5
|-
| style="text-align:left;"| 
| style="text-align:left;"|Golden State
| 5 || 0 || 8.0 || .190 || .000 || –  || 0.6 || 2.4 || 0.0 || 0.0 || 1.6
|- class="sortbottom"
| style="text-align:center;" colspan="2"| Career
| 100 || 43 || 19.5 || .344 || .333 || .748 || 1.8 || 2.2 || 0.6 || 0.1 || 6.5

Playoffs 

|-
|style="text-align:left;"|2003
|style="text-align:left;"|Boston
|10||0||14.7||.286||.250||.875||1.5||1.2||0.3||0.0||4.7
|- class="sortbottom"
| style="text-align:center;" colspan="2"| Career
|10||0||14.7||.286||.250||.875||1.5||1.2||0.3||0.0||4.7

References

External links
 NBA.com Profile
 NBA Statistics
 Euroleague.net Profile
 FIBA.com Profile
 FIBA Europe Profile
 Eurobasket.com Profile
 Italian League Profile 
 Spanish League Profile 
 Turkish League Profile

1980 births
Living people
ABA League players
African-American basketball players
American expatriate basketball people in Bosnia and Herzegovina
American expatriate basketball people in France
American expatriate basketball people in Italy
American expatriate basketball people in Greece
American expatriate basketball people in Russia
American expatriate basketball people in Spain
American expatriate basketball people in Turkey
Basketball players from Cleveland
BC Krasnye Krylia players
BC Nizhny Novgorod players
BC Spartak Primorye players
BC Zenit Saint Petersburg players
Bosnia and Herzegovina men's basketball players
Bosnia and Herzegovina people of African-American descent
Boston Celtics players
Baloncesto Málaga players
Charlotte Bobcats expansion draft picks
Cleveland Cavaliers players
Fenerbahçe men's basketball players
Golden State Warriors players
Greek Basket League players
Liga ACB players
Limoges CSP players
Olimpia Milano players
Naturalized citizens of Bosnia and Herzegovina
P.A.O.K. BC players
Pallacanestro Biella players
Point guards
St. Bonaventure Bonnies men's basketball players
Torku Konyaspor B.K. players
Undrafted National Basketball Association players
American men's basketball players
Cleveland Heights High School alumni
21st-century African-American sportspeople
20th-century African-American people